Edgemere is an unincorporated community and census-designated place in Baltimore County, Maryland, United States. The population was 8,669 at the 2010 census.  Founded in 1899 as Edgemere being renamed from previous name "Fitzell".  Meeting held at the Fitzell Farm which was situated where the old Rheem plant was located (later it became the record storage facility for Bethlehem Steel plant at Sparrows Point).

Geography
Edgemere is located at  (39.229258, −76.448981).

Demographics

At the 2000 census there were 9,248 people, 3,530 households, and 2,513 families living in the CDP. The racial makeup of the CDP was 93.43% White, 5.19% African American, 0.18% Native American, 0.31% Asian, 0.18% Pacific Islander, 0.09% from other races, and 0.62% from two or more races. Hispanic or Latino of any race were 0.66%.

Of the 3,530 households 28.2% had children under the age of 18 living with them, 55.9% were married couples living together, 10.1% had a female householder with no husband present, and 28.8% were non-families. 24.0% of households were one person and 12.3% were one person aged 65 or older. The average household size was 2.58 and the average family size was 3.04.

The age distribution was 22.1% under the age of 18, 7.2% from 18 to 24, 26.9% from 25 to 44, 27.1% from 45 to 64, and 16.7% 65 or older. The median age was 41 years. For every 100 females, there were 98.1 males. For every 100 females age 18 and over, there were 98.3 males.

The median household income was $46,928 and the median family income  was $55,662. Males had a median income of $40,577 versus $28,398 for females. The per capita income for the CDP was $20,802. About 5.4% of families and 7.0% of the population were below the poverty line, including 9.0% of those under age 18 and 8.6% of those age 65 or over.

References

External links

Census-designated places in Maryland
Census-designated places in Baltimore County, Maryland